The gay flag of South Africa is a pride flag that aims to reflect the freedom and diversity of South Africa and build pride in being an LGBTQ South African. It was registered as the flag of the LGBTQ Association of South Africa in 2012 and is not an official symbol of South Africa.

Design
Designed by Eugene Brockman, the flag is a hybrid of the South African national flag, which was launched in 1994 after the end of the apartheid era, and the LGBT rainbow flag. Brockman said "I truly believe we (the LGBT community) put the dazzle into our rainbow nation and this flag is a symbol of just that". The stated purposes of the flag include celebrating legal same-sex marriage in South Africa and addressing issues such as discrimination, homophobia and corrective rape.

History
The flag was launched on 18 December 2010 at the Mother City Queer Project costume party which is held annually and took place that year at the new Cape Town Stadium.

On 20 July 2012, the flag was registered at South Africa's Bureau of Heraldry as a heraldic flag representing the LGBT Association of South Africa. It is not an official national symbol, and not the only South African version of the LGBT rainbow flag.

Gallery

See also 
 LGBT rights in South Africa

References

2010 in LGBT history
Flags introduced in 2010
Flags of South Africa
LGBT flags
LGBT culture in South Africa
LGBT
Sexuality flags